Elivie-Societá Italiana Esercizio Elicotteri was a helicopter airline of Italy.

History
The airline was established in November 1956 under the ELI-Linee Italiane S.p.A. with capital of IRI and Alitalia operating 1 A.B.204 and  2 Agusta-Bell AB.102 helicopters. In 1959, the airline was rebranded as Elivie.

In 1967, the airline acquired two Sikorsky S-61. In October 1969 Elivie carried 34,821 passengers.

In 1970, Alitalia stopped the Elivie operations, because it was considered unprofitable.  A year before, IRI retired their investment on Elivie.

Historical fleet

See also
 List of defunct airlines of Italy

References

External links
dugaldo.it
timetables.com
Sikorsky S-61

Italian companies established in 1960
1970 disestablishments in Italy
Defunct airlines of Italy
Alitalia
Airlines established in 1960
Airlines disestablished in 1970